Pratap Rudra Singh Deo (23 July 1853 – 8 August 1902 ), was Raja of Sonepur from 1891 until his death in 1902.

Biography 
He was born on 23 July 1853 to Niladhar Singh Deo. He succeeded his father on 11 September 1891. He had earned himself the reputation of a capable and wise ruler by his conduct and the management of his affairs. He obtained the title of Raja Bahadur on 1 January 1898 in recognition of the improved methods of administration he introduced. He died on 8 August 1902, and the succession passed to his eldest son, Bir Mitrodaya Singh Deo.

References 

1853 births
1902 deaths